The Astro 7 was a seven-cylinder radial aircraft engine built by Isotta Fraschini in the 1930s.

Design and development
Fabrica Automobili Isotta Fraschini (Isotta Fraschini) was founded in 1898 to manufacture cars and internal combustion engines. Isotta Fraschini engines powered many Italian airships and military aircraft during World War I, becoming one of the largest engine producers in Italy. At the outbreak of World War II Isotta Fraschini had a large portfolio of engines but suffered from a lack of large orders, with a few exceptions. The Astro 7 C seven-cylinder radial engine failed to attract orders in any quantity and failed to give the company significant return on the development costs.

With few applications the Astro 7 C family was not produced in large quantities.

Variants
Data from:Jane's All the World's Aircraft 1938, Jane's All the World's Aircraft 1937

Applications
 Caproni Ca.406A (intended)

Specifications (Astro 7 C.20)
{{Pistonspecs

| ref =Jane's All the World's Aircraft 1938, and Jane's All the World's Aircraft 1937''. 
| type = 7-cylinder air-cooled radial piston engine
| bore = 
| stroke = 
| displacement = 
| length = 
| diameter = 
| width = 
| height = 
| weight = 
| valvetrain = 2 x overhead valves per cylinder driven by pushrods and rockers
| supercharger = 7.7:1 crankshaft speed 
| turbocharger = 
| fuelsystem = Isotta Fraschini L.95.I inverted carburetor with automatic height control and centrifugal regulator boost control
| fueltype = 
| oilsystem = pressure system with dry sump and scavenge pump
| coolingsystem = 
| power =
 at 1,900 rpm for 5 minutes (take-off) 
| specpower = 
| compression = 6:1
| fuelcon = 
| specfuelcon = 
| oilcon = 
| power/weight = 
| designer = 
| reduction_gear = 
| general_other = 
| components_other = 2 x Marelli MF.7 magnetos with automatic advance
 Compressed air starter
| performance_other = 
}}

See also

References

Isotta Fraschini aircraft engines
1930s aircraft piston engines